Mosdeng is a  Tripuri food  made of chilies. The chilies are usually burnt slightly over an open flame to give a smoky flavor. Mosdeng is a side dish prepared by grinding fresh roasted chilies, salt, and a roasted small, dry, and oil-pasted fish called berma (fermented). Sometimes vegetables are added.

References

Tripuri cuisine